The Minister for Major Events was a ministry first established in 2010 in the Keneally ministry and combined with Tourism and Gaming and Racing in the O'Farrell ministry. Major Events was abolished as a portfolio title in the second Berejiklian ministry.

History 
The first minister with specific responsibility for a major event was Michael Knight as the Minister for Olympics, following the success of the Sydney bid to host the 2000 Summer Olympics. The minister concurrently held the portfolios of Public Works and Services and Roads and was closely linked to the provisions of buildings and infrastructure for the event.

The portfolio of Major Events was not responsible for a department, nor any legislation, with the Major Events Act 2009 remaining the responsibility of the Premier. The first minister, Ian Macdonald, also held the portfolios of State and Regional Development, Mineral and Forest Resources, and Central Coast. In 2011 the portfolio was absorbed by the new portfolio of Tourism, Major Events, Hospitality and Racing and remained a named part of portfolios until 2019 when it became part of the portfolio of Jobs, Investment, Tourism and Western Sydney.

List of ministers 
The following individuals have served as minister where major events were part of the responsibilities in the portfolio:

References 

Major Events